Vincent Mallet (born 8 February 1993) is a French rugby union player. He plays at fly-half for Stade Français in the Top 14.

References

External links
Ligue Nationale De Rugby Profile
European Professional Club Rugby Profile
Stade Français Profile

French rugby union players
Stade Français players
1993 births
Living people
Rugby union fly-halves